Aluki Kotierk is an Inuk politician. She was born in Iqaluit, Nunavut, but grew up in Igloolik.

Early life 
Kotierk was born in Iqaluit, Eastern Northwest Territories (now Nunavut) in 1975. She holds a bachelor's degree in Native Studies and Comparative Development and a master's degree in Native Studies and Canadian Studies from Trent University in Peterborough, Ontario.

Career 
She held positions at  Inuit Tapirisat of Canada in Ottawa (now Inuit Tapiriit Kanatami), Pauktuutit and Nunavut Sivuniksavut. In 2004, Kotierk moved to Iqaluit to work for the Government of Nunavut, first as the director of Inuit Qaujimajatuqangit and later as a deputy minister.

In November, 2016 she took leave from her position as Director of Inuit Employment and Training at Nunavut Tunngavik Inc. to run in the Nunavut Tunngavik Incorporated (NTI) presidential election. In December she beat the President at the time, Cathy Towtongie by 243 votes.

Kotierk's four main areas of focus during her presidency are empowerment, Inuit language and culture, collective healing and Inuit identity.

Personal life 
Kotierk is based in Iqaluit, speaks Inuktitut, has five children and one grandchild.

References

1975 births
Living people
Women in Nunavut politics
People from Igloolik
People from Iqaluit
Canadian Inuit women
Inuit from Nunavut